Dorothy Irene Wallace Andreoli is an American number theorist, mathematical biologist, and mathematics educator. She is a professor of mathematics at Dartmouth College.

Education
Wallace is a graduate of Yale University. She completed her Ph.D. in 1982 at the University of California, San Diego. Her dissertation, Selberg's Trace Formula and Units in Higher Degree Number Fields, concerned number theory and was supervised by Audrey Terras.

Contributions
Wallace is the author or co-author of books including:
Applications of Calculus to Biology and Medicine: Case Studies from Lake Victoria (with Nathan Ryan, World Scientific, 2017)
The Bell That Rings Light: A Primer in Quantum Mechanics and Chemical Bonding (with Joseph BelBruno, World Scientific, 2006)

With art curator Kathy Hart, Wallace co-curated the exhibit "Visual Proof: the Experience of Mathematics in Art" at Dartmouth's Hood Museum of Art in 1999.
With mathematics colleague Marcia Groszek and performance artist Josh Kornbluth, Wallace has also helped write and produce a sequence of educational videos about mathematics.

Recognition
Wallace was named New Hampshire CASE Professor of the Year in 2000.
In 2019 the Dartmouth Alumni Association gave Wallace their Rassias Award for educational outreach to alumni, for her 15 years of work giving mathematics lectures on Dartmouth alumni travel excursions.

References

External links
Home page

Year of birth missing (living people)
Living people
20th-century American mathematicians
21st-century American mathematicians
American women mathematicians
Yale University alumni
University of California, San Diego alumni
Dartmouth College faculty
Number theorists
20th-century American women
21st-century American women